Clerks: Music from the Motion Picture is the 1994 soundtrack album to Kevin Smith's  1994 film of the same name. The soundtrack features alternative rock,  grunge, and punk rock songs performed by various artists, as well as audio clips from the film. As would be expected with popular bands, the soundtrack cost more money than the film itself.

On November 15, 2012, Smith found the original copy of the tape inside his house. The tape was dubbed over an instructional 4 track cassette. According to Smith, "Henry Hudson Regional school mate Scott Angley and his band LOVE AMONGST FREAKS recorded the score, opening song and others pieces on an old 4 track recorder in their garage."

Track listing

References

1994 soundtrack albums
Comedy film soundtracks